Honeychurch may refer to:

 Honeychurch (band), an American band
 Honeychurch, Devon, a village in England
 Honeychurch (surname)